KF Poliçani is an Albanian football club based in the small town of Poliçan. KF Poliçani is currently not competing in the senior football league.

Achievements
 Albanian Second Division Title – 1968

External links
Second Division Standings and Stats

 
Policani
Poliçan
Kategoria e Dytë clubs